HP ZCentral Remote Boost, formerly known as HP Remote Graphics Software or HP RGS is a client-server remote desktop software developed by HP Inc. and initially launched in 2003. HP RGS enables remote access to high-performance workstations (or virtual workstations) from many different devices including other Workstations, PCs, Windows tablets, MacBooks and thin-clients. The software is targeted at remote access to graphic intensive applications, Video editing and complex 3D models. Collaboration, or screen sharing, between multiple users, remote USB and sound, as well as Windows and Linux are also supported.  HP markets RGS for "Real-Time Collaboration", "Workstation-Class Mobility" and "Remote Workers"

In 2020 HP updated and re-branded RGS as part of the HP ZCentral Solution. ZCentral Remote Boost was awarded an Engineering Emmy Award in 2020 for enabling TV productions around the world to make it to air despite teams being unable to access their usual studios.

With HP RGS all the processing, including hardware-accelerated graphics with the latest OpenGL or DirectX rendering, is done on the workstation and only compressed bitmap images (the screen) are sent to the client device.  HP RGS is distinguished by its proprietary compression algorithms which allows for real-time transmission of complex 3D images and video, which traditional remote desktop protocols struggle with. This opens up the use of remote desktops and thin clients to graphics-intensive industries such as CAD, oil and gas exploration, animation, architecture engineering and construction which previously required local workstations.

Performance improvements in RGS 7.1 opened up even more demanding use cases including remoting 4K displays, delivering 60 frames per second, or remote desktop sessions of 3D CAD applications with peak bandwidth usage under 3 Mbit/s. In 2014 HP released RGS 7.0 which brought remote workstation use cases to tablet devices. The remote desktop tool has shown resilience against latency and packet loss when compared to Citrix HDX 3D or Teradici's PCoiP.

There are two components to the software, the sender (for the workstation or server) and the receiver (for the client device). The software supports OpenGL and Microsoft DirectX. The software is sold stand alone for servers, virtual machines and non HP Workstations. HP started including RGS with all of its desktop Z brand workstations starting with version 5.4.7 in 2011. RGS can be downloaded from HP and run on HP Z Workstations and ZBook mobile workstations for free. Other hardware requires a license for the HP RGS sender.  The receiver is a free download for Windows, Linux and macOS clients.

An early version of the HP RGS video compression codec, is derived from a patented system developed by HP Labs and used in the NASA Mars rover program.

Industry Use Cases
HP Remote Graphics software is used in many industries including:

Oil and Gas
HP RGS is used for its performance with high visual fidelity and support for Linux-based applications. The massive amounts of data going into the visualizations make a server/client model ideal.

Financial Traders
HP RGS stability and support for multiple high resolution displays and fast update rate have made it ideal for this market since the release of the HP Blade Workstation solution in 2006.

Animation, TV, Film and Special Effects
HP RGS support for remote video editing, Linux-based applications, real time collaboration and visual fidelity have made it ideal for TV, film and animation studios.

Architecture Engineering and Construction
HP RGS is used for collaboration to enable subject matter experts to work on various projects around the globe. Centralizing large data sets and remoting the pixels allows users to spend more time working and less time loading the project for the day.

Product Design
HP RGS is used to collaborate on design projects and enable remote workers.

Education
Engineering and Animation programs get the same benefits as their professional counterparts with the added benefit of allowing students to access the expensive applications from home 24/7.

Versions
The HP RGS release notes are posted at www.hp.com/go/rgs

See also
 Comparison of remote desktop software

References

External links
 Remote Graphics Software homepage

HP software
NASA spin-off technologies
Remote desktop protocols
Remote desktop
Thin clients
Virtualization software